Gianfranco Gazzana Priaroggia (30 August 1912 – 23 May 1943) was an officer in the Italian Royal Navy (Regia Marina), and was the highest-scoring Italian submarine captain of World War II.

World War II
He was responsible for sinking 120,243 GRT (Bruttoregistertonnen, or BRT).

He was posthumously awarded the Medaglia d'oro al valor militare and Knight's Cross of the Iron Cross.

Legacy
Two submarines have been named after him. The USS Pickerel which was transferred from the US Navy in 1972 and a Sauro-class submarine.

References

Citations

Bibliography

 Blair, Clay, Hitler's U-boat War: The Hunters, 1939-1942. Random House 1996. 
 

1912 births
1943 deaths
Regia Marina personnel
Italian military personnel killed in World War II
Recipients of the Gold Medal of Military Valor
Recipients of the Silver Medal of Military Valor
Recipients of the Knight's Cross of the Iron Cross
Submarine commanders
Military personnel from Milan
Captains who went down with the ship